William Street is a major street in the central business district of Melbourne, Victoria, Australia. It runs roughly north–south from Flinders Street to Victoria Street, and was laid out in 1837 as part of the original Hoddle Grid. The street is located in-between King Street and Queen Street.

Notable landmarks on William Street include the Queen Victoria Market, the Flagstaff Gardens, Immigration Museum, Supreme Court of Victoria, AMP Square, Australian Club and 140 William Street (formerly BHP House).

History

2007 shooting incident

On 18 June 2007, a shooting incident occurred on the corner of Flinders Lane and William Street when an unknown man shot and killed a pedestrian and wounded two others. Christopher Hudson later pleaded guilty to the shootings.

2017 car attack

On 20 January 2017, a car was driven into pedestrians in the CBD of Melbourne, killing 5 and injuring over 20. The driver was stopped when police shot him in the arm and subsequently pulled him from his vehicle on William Street (at the corner of Bourke Street).

Notable buildings 
Several buildings and structures on William Street are listed on the Victorian Heritage Register and/or classified by the National Trust of Australia. These include:
 140 William Street (former BHP House)
 Australian Club Building
 Court of Appeal
 Goldsborough Mort Building
 Hume House
 Prometheus Mural in Monash House
 Queensland Building
 Royal Melbourne Mint (former)
 Royal Standard Hotel
 Scottish House
 Shell Corner (former)
 Supreme Court of Victoria
 Western House

Law Courts precinct 

William Street's junction with Lonsdale Street forms the legal precinct of Melbourne. This junction is the location of the Supreme Court of Victoria, Melbourne Magistrates' Court and County Court. The Federal Court building, housing the High Court and other Federal courts, is located one block further north on the corner of William Street and La Trobe Street. The Law Institute of Victoria is located one block south of Lonsdale Street at the corner of Bourke Street.

Transport
Flagstaff railway station is situated on William Street. Besides that, William Street is also served by a tram route. Tram route 58 runs along William Street between Peel Street and Flinders Lane.

See also

References

Streets in Melbourne City Centre